The Daily Bugle (at one time The DB) is a fictional New York City tabloid newspaper appearing as a plot element in American comic books published by Marvel Comics. The Daily Bugle is a regular fixture in the Marvel Universe, most prominently in Spider-Man comic titles and their derivative media. The newspaper first appeared in the Human Torch story in Marvel Mystery Comics #18 (April 1941). It returned in Fantastic Four #2 (January 1962). Its offices first shown in The Amazing Spider-Man #1 (March 1963). 

The Daily Bugle was first featured on film in the 2002 film Spider-Man. The fictional newspaper is meant to be a pastiche of both the New York Daily News and the New York Post, two popular real-life New York City tabloids. The outlet appears in Sam Raimi's Spider-Man trilogy (2002–07), Marc Webb's The Amazing Spider-Man duology (2012–14) and Sony's Spider-Man Universe (2018–present). The agency is reimagined as a sensationalist news website in the Marvel Cinematic Universe (MCU) films Spider-Man: Far From Home (2019) and Spider-Man: No Way Home (2021), the SSU film Venom: Let There Be Carnage (2021), and the web series The Daily Bugle (2019–present), headlined by J. K. Simmons and Angourie Rice as J. Jonah Jameson and Betty Brant. An alternate version of the web series hosted by Nicque Marina was featured in promotional material for the SSU film Morbius (2022).

Publishing history
The Daily Bugle is featured prominently in many Marvel Comics titles, especially those in which Spider-Man is the lead character. In 1996, a three-issue (black and white) limited series was printed.

Since 2006, Marvel has published a monthly Daily Bugle newspaper reporting on the company's publications and authors. Marvel earlier used the newspaper format to promote Marvel's crossover events Civil War and House of M—reporting on storyline events as if the comic book Daily Bugle had come to life. Marvel restored this promotional function for the 2007 death of Captain America.

Fictional History
The Daily Bugle was founded in 1898 and has been published daily ever since. The Daily Bugle is printed in tabloid format like its rival the Daily Globe. The editor and publisher of the Bugle, J. Jonah Jameson, began his journalistic career as a reporter for the Bugle while still in high school. Jameson purchased the then-floundering Bugle with inheritance funds, from his recently deceased father-in-law and turned the paper into a popular success. Other magazines published from time-to-time include the revived Now magazine and the now-defunct Woman magazine, edited by Carol Danvers.

J. Jonah Jameson, Inc. purchased the Goodman Building on 39th Street and Second Avenue in 1936 and moved its entire editorial and publishing facilities there. Now called the Daily Bugle Building, the office complex is forty-six stories tall, and is capped by the Daily Bugle logo in  letters on the roof. There are loading docks in the rear of the building, reached by a back alley. Three floors are devoted to the editorial office of the Bugle and two sub-basement levels to the printing presses, while the rest of the floors are rented. (A panel in #105 of The Amazing Spider-Man showed the Bugle building located near a street sign at the corner of Madison Avenue and a street in the East Fifties (the second digit was not shown). This suggests that the building may have been relocated at some point.)

The newspaper is noted for its anti-superhero slant, especially concerning Spider-Man, whom the paper constantly smears as a part of its editorial policy. However, the Editor-in-Chief, "Robbie" Robertson, the only subordinate to Jameson who is not intimidated by him, has worked to moderate it. More positively, the newspaper has also published important exposés of political corruption and organized crime in the city, and also takes a strong stance in favor of mutant rights, which has led to its being targeted by various criminals and hate groups.

Due to declining circulation, Jameson has conceded to Robertson's objections and has created a special feature section of the paper called The Pulse, which focuses on superheroes. In addition, the paper also intermittently ran a glossy magazine called Now Magazine.

Soon after the team's formation, the New Avengers decided to strike a deal with Jameson regarding exclusive content in exchange for removing the strong anti-Spider-Man sentiment from the newspaper, to which Jameson agreed. Merely one day later, Jameson broke the spirit (though not the letter) of his agreement with Iron Man, using the headline "a wanted murderer (Wolverine), an alleged ex-member of a terrorist organization (Spider-Woman) and a convicted heroin-dealer (Luke Cage) are just some of the new recruits set to bury the once good name of the Avengers," but refraining from attacking Spider-Man. This prompted Jessica Jones to sell the first pictures of her newborn baby to one of the Bugles competitors instead.

In the first issue of Runaways vol. 2, Victor Mancha states in an exchange about Spider-Man that "The only people who think he's a criminal are Fox News and the Daily Bugle. And the Bugle is, like, the least respected newspaper in New York City." The paper's major named competitors are the Daily Globe, which implicitly takes a more balanced look at the superhero, Front Line, run by EIC Ben Urich and Sally Floyd, and The Alternative. After Peter Parker revealed he is Spider-Man and the Bugle planned to sue him for fraud, the paper itself was put on the defensive with front page accusations from The Globe (with information secretly supplied by Bugle reporter Betty Brant) of libeling the superhero.

The adventures of the staff of the newspaper beyond Peter Parker have been depicted in two series, Daily Bugle and The Pulse.

The DB

After Jameson suffered a near-fatal heart attack, his wife sold the Bugle to rival newspaper man Dexter Bennett, who changed the name to The DB (either standing for Dexter Bennett or Daily Bugle), and transformed it into a scandal sheet. Since after Brand New Day no one knows the secret identity of Spider-Man anymore, the animosity between Jameson and Parker is retconned as a simple financial question, with Jameson's heart attack coming right after a monetary request from Peter.

The reputation of the DB since the mention in Runaways has plummeted down because of the new, scandalistic angle Bennett gives it. Several reporters unwilling, or refusing the new course, like Peter himself, are forced to go away, finding a new safe haven in the Front Line, the only magazine willing to accept people fired by Bennett, pursuing a scorched earth policy over them.

The villain Electro targeted Dexter Bennett because of a government bailout plan for the financially strapped paper. Spider-Man intervened, and during a battle inside the DB offices, the entire building was demolished, bringing an end to the newspaper as well.

Front LineFront Line was a newspaper founded and run by Ben Urich and Sally Floyd. The organization was formed in Civil War: Front Line #11 as Frontlines.com. The newspaper appeared in the miniseries World War Hulk: Front Line and Siege: Embedded. Originally it was not competitive with the Daily Bugle while Jameson was still in charge, but it became an alternative view to The DB once Bennett took control.

Reborn
Sometime after the DB's destruction, Jameson, now the mayor of New York cashed in the DB shares he acquired from Bennett and gave the money to Robbie Robertson. Jameson asked Robertson to remake Front Line (which itself was on hard times) into the new Daily Bugle.

Fictional staff members

CurrentBetty Brant (reporter), Secretary (formerly)Abner AbernathyTom Amos (reporter) – Named but yet to be seen
Alejandro Arbona (copy editor) – based on an actual personJohanna Audiffred (Jeff Suter's assistant)Connor Austen (reporter) – attended SHIELD press conferenceChris Baiocchi (staff writer) – interviewed Tony StarkJohn Barber (copy editor)Ron Barney (reporter) – Named but yet to be seen.Joe Bazooka (reporter) – Named but yet to be seen.Noel Beckford (reporter)Aaron "Abe" Benerstein (film critic)Mike Berino Bering (reporter) – Named but yet to be seen.Miriam Birchwood (gossip columnist) – Attended Reed and Sue Richards' wedding.Phil Bostwich (reporter) – Named but yet to be seen.
Tom Brevoort (executive editor) – based on actual personKenny BrownBlaine Browne (reporter)Isabel "Izzy" Bunsen (science editor)Ed Brubaker (reporter) – based on actual person, co-wrote report of Captain America's assassination with Kat Farrell.Dan Buckley (J. Jonah Jameson's assistant)Marge Butler (Receptionist)Harrison Cahill (chairman of the board)Ken Clarke (reporter)George Clum (theater critic)Ksitigarbha "Miss Kay" Cohn (reporter)Peggy Collins (Intern)Cole Cooper (photographer)Kathryn "Kate" Cushing (city editor)Vickie Danner (Washington DC liaison)Peter David (reporter) – based on actual personDan Davis (reporter)Albert Jack Dickinson (reporter)Nick Dillman (reporter)Herman Donaldson (fact checker)Kim Drunter (financial reporter)Rich DuFour (reporter)Sam Dunne (national editor)Anthea Dupres (reporter)Edwin E. Edwards (photographer)Ken Ellis (reporter) – dubbed the Scarlet Spider... the Scarlet Spider.Christine EverhartSteve Epting (photographer) – Based on the comic book artistMark Ewing (reporter) – Investigated the alleged conspiracy involving the group ControlSamuel Exmore (apprentice editor)Tony Falcone (copy writer)Debby FerraroNicholas Finch (reporter)Bob Fisck (political correspondent) – interviewed Valerie CooperSid Franken (reporter)Colm Glover (reporter) – Named but yet to be seenTim Gluohy (reporter) – Named but yet to be seen.Melvin Gooner (reporter)Glory Grant (Administrative Assistant)Justin Gray (reporter) – based on actual personMarc Guggenheim (reporter) – based on actual personBanning GumpartToni Harris (apprentice editor)Matt Hicksville (reporter) – Named but yet to be seenDavid Hine (reporter)Jean-Paul HoffmanRuss HolmesEdward Holt (purchasing officer)Matt Idelson (reporter) – Named but yet to be seenMax Igoe (sports writer)Frank Janson (rewrite editor)Hal Jerkins (typesetter)Bud Johnson (page designer)Charles Jones (member of the board of directors)Richard Jones (Phantom Reporter) – offer a job as a reporterDavid L. Kanon (photographer)Richard "Dick" Katrobousis (editor)Steve Keene (accountant)Samuel Kingston (syndicated columns editor) – offered Phantom Reporter a job because of his "unique" perspective.Lee "Your Man at the Bugle" Kirby (Entertainment Writer), based on actual personsRichard "Andy" Lessman (reporter)Yusef Lichtenstein (editor)Maggie Lorca (reporter)Nick Lowe (entertainment editor)Judy Lumley (society & fashion editor)Karen LynchEileen Lutomski (proofreader)Ann MacIntosh (columnist and classified editor)Jerome Maida (reporter)Midge Marder (editor)Ralfie Markarian (reporter)Michael Marts (reporter) – Named but yet to be seenTom Marvelli (Art Director)Mike Mayhew (photographer)Maggie McCulloch (chief librarian)Jim Mclaughlin (reporter)Patrick McGrath (Graphic Designer) – Based on a real personJoy Mercado (reporter) – A tough, intelligent, sassy investigative reporter, a friend of Peter Parker who may suspect he is really Spider-Man.Clifford Meth (reporter) – interviewed Tony Stark and WaspDawn Michaels (investigative reporter)Harvey Michaelson (reporter)Kirk Morello (reporter) – interviewed Misty Knight & Colleen WingDaniel Morton (photographer)Terry Morrow (staff writer)Danny Nasimoff (night editor)Jim Nausedas (Jeff Suter's assistant)Ben O'Malley (freelance writer) – wrote article on Super-Hero imitationSean O'Reilly (reporter) Marge O'TooleBill Oakley (reporter)Jan Parsec (reporter) – Named but yet to be seenTrevor Parsons (reporter)Victor Paunchilito (Reporter/Columnist)Victor Pei (assistant photography editor)Suzie Pelkey (receptionist)Ryan Penagos (reporter) – based on actual person, interviewed Tony Stark and David Purdin.Robert Pitney (typesetter)Bill Price (reporter)Gus Qualen (photographer)Joe Quesada (Joe Robertson's assistant) – based on actual personDavid Rabinowitz (reporter)Ralph Reddin (security guard)Brian Reed (reporter) – based on actual personCarl Reed-Duxfield (reporter)Tony Reeves (photographer)Patrick Reynolds (reporter)Jim RichardsonKim RobinsonBill Rosemann (editor) – based on actual personFabio Rossi (Advertising Salesman)Mike Sangiocomo (correspondent)Andy Schmidt (political editor) – based on an actual personCory Sedlmeier (photo editor) – based on actual personArnold Sibert (entertainment editor and movie critic) – became involved in opposing a plot of MysterioJoe Sidesaddle (reporter) – Named but yet to be seenWarren Simons (sports editor) – based on actual personSanjay Sinclair (reporter)Dan Slott (reporter) – based on actual personCharles "Charley" Snow (reporter)John Snow (White House Spokesperson)Jeff Stern (reporter)J. Michael Straczinski (reporter) – based on actual person, worked for the Marvel Comics universe version of Marvel Comics.Jeff Suter (Senior Art Director) – based on actual personBill Tatters (reporter) – Named but yet to be seenLeila Taylor (reporter)Duke Thomas (reporter)Wendy Thorton (sports columnist)
Maury Toeitch (reporter) – Named but yet to be seenReginald Lance ToomeyDilbert Trilby (obituary writer)Charlie Verreos (reporter)Bill Webb (photographer)David Weiss (copy editor)Sydney Weiss (reporter)Zeb Wells (reporter) – based on actual personJill Whyte-Blythe (reporter)Sarah Williams (photographer)Spence Williams (Intern)Richard Wormly (editor-in-chief's assistant)Bill Xanthis (rewrite editor)Angela Yin (photographer) – Sister of the criminal DragonflyCallum Broom (photographer)Mickey Zimmer (photographer)Lester (reporter)

FormerDexter Bennett (Former owner)J. Jonah Jameson (publisher)Joseph "Robbie" Robertson (Editor-in-Chief) – Presently the Editor-in Chief for Frontline.Nick Bandouveris (reporter) – Killed by Bastion; his murder is the reason JJJ didn't take the Xavier files from BastionLance Bannon (photographer) – killed by F.A.C.A.D.E.Eleanore Arlene Brant (Jameson's Former Secretary) – Betty's mother; put into comaMeredith Campbell (intern)Jack "Flash Gun" Casey (Reporter circa 1940s)Jacob Conover (reporter) – In jail after being revealed to be the criminal RoseEthan Edwards (Virtue/Tiller/Moral-Man) (reporter)Katherine "Kat" Farrell (reporter)Ian Fate (reporter)Thomas Fireheart (Puma) (Owner)Frederick Foswell (reporter) – Got fired from the Bugle then rehired again; he later dies saving Spider-ManPhil Fox (reporter) – deceasedCliff Garner (reporter) – formerly of the Air Force, investigated the possible conspiracy of Control, slain by co-conspiracy theorist General Edward HarrisonSimon J. Goodman (publisher) – publisher in the 1940s, name is probably a reference to Martin Goodman, first publisher of Marvel Comics.William Walter Goodman (Owner/Publisher)Irving GriffinDerek Gratham (intern)Randy Green (reporter) – Mystique in disguise, seen working as a Daily Bugle reporter in X-FactorAmber Grant (freelance photographer) – made Peter Parker envious of her ability to tell off Jameson and still sell to him; current status unknownJeffrey Haight (photographer) – former boyfriend of Anna Kefkin, made alliance with Dr. Octopus in desperate effort to gain a front-page photograph. Sent to prison for assisting in Dr. Octopus' escape.Walter "Old Man" Jameson (Editor/Reporter) – Mistakenly assumed to be JJJ's father, David Jameson.Jessica Jones (Superhero correspondent and consultant) – Resigned after Jameson trashed then-boyfriend, Luke Cage in an article about the New AvengersNick Katzenberg (reporter) – died of lung cancerTerri Kidder (reporter) – killed by the Green GoblinSimon LaGrange (reporter) – firedNed Leeds (Hobgoblin) (reporter) – killed by the Foreigner's menSean Lowe (editor)Laurie Lynton (columnist)Jeff Mace (Patriot/Captain America) (Reporter circa 1940)James Jonah "JJ" McTeer (reporter) – deceasedIrene Merryweather (reporter) – freelance and then became salaried, FiredMary Morgan (Miss Patriot) (Reporter circa 1940s)Glorianna O'Breen (photographer) – deceasedNorman Osborn (Green Goblin) (Owner) – Bought then lost control of the BuglePeter Parker (photographer, usually freelance): Fired for refusing to accept Dexter Bennett's way of doing business. Presently works as a freelance photographer for the "Frontline".Jess Patton (Secretary) – Killed and body taken over by the ThousandAddie Pinckney (Los Angeles Correspondent) – status unknown, was elderly when depicted.Armando Ruiz (Janitor) – deceasedChristine Ryan (reporter) – resignedChuck Self (reporter) – Handcuffed himself to the Punisher to get a story; died from falling into a woodchipperPhil Sheldon (photographer) – Retired after the death of Gwen StacyGabriel Simms (Security Guard) – deceasedC. Thomas Sites (Reporter circa 1940s)Paul Swanson (reporter) – firedBen Urich (reporter) – Resigns after the Civil War and creates Frontline.Phil Urich (cameraman for Norah Winters, current Hobgoblin); fired after secret identity was exposed. – Currently working in LA with the LonersLynn Walsh (Intern)William "Billy" Walters (photographer) – Left the Bugle to care for his aging mother.Norah Winters (reporter); fired due to affiliation with Phil Urich after his secret identity was exposed.Ray Rothman (employee) – fired by J. Jonah Jameson for viewing article.

 Reception 

 Accolades 

 In 2019, CBR.com ranked the Daily Bugle 2nd in their "Top 10 Fictional Marvel Companies" list.

 Impact 
 The Daily Bugle appears on a newspaper in the 1977 horror movie Death Bed: The Bed That Eats.
 The Daily Bugle appears in the 1994 film The Shawshank Redemption.

 Other versions 
 Age of Apocalypse 
In the Age of Apocalypse timeline, the Daily Bugle is a clandestine paper run by humans meant to inform the public about the secrets of Apocalypse, here the tyrannical ruler of North America. This Daily Bugle is run by a Robbie Robertson, who is killed by a Brood-infected Christopher Summers, leaving the status of the paper unknown.

 Amalgam 
The Daily Bugle appears in the Amalgam (DC & Marvel Comics) world. Similar to the mainstream Bugle, employees include J. Jonah White, Tana Moon, Jack Ryder and Spider-Boy. In this world, the Daily Bugle regularly produces cover stories revolving around Spider-Boy's love life.

 1602 
In the Marvel 1602 setting, Jameson is publisher of the first "news-sheet" in the New World; the Daily Trumpet.

 House of M 
In this alternate reality, the Daily Bugle exists mostly as a propaganda machine for the ruling mutant hierarchy. Stories can be and are repressed if they aren't favorable enough to mutants. In this reality, a blue-skinned woman named Cerena Taylor is the editor-in-chief. Other staff members include Bugman (the Daily Bugles paparazzi driver), Jacob Guntherson (the Daily Bugle's photographer), and Triporter (the Daily Bugle's three-eyed reporter).

 Ultimate Marvel 
In the Ultimate Marvel universe, the Bugle is much the same as in the 616 version. The main difference is that Peter Parker is not employed as a photographer, but works on the newspaper's website after Jameson sees him assist with a problem. The newspaper plays less of a role in Ultimate Spider-Man than it did in the comics portraying the equivalent period of the 616 Spider-Man's career. Peter frequently implies that he doesn't spend much time there. After the events of Ultimatum, the Daily Bugle, much like the rest of New York, was heavily damaged. Instead of a full rebuild, the Bugle was made into an online newspaper and blog.

In other media
Television
 The Daily Bugle appears in The Amazing Spider-Man live-action TV series.
 A Daily Bugle newspaper appears in the Spider-Woman episode "The Kongo Spider".
 A Daily Bugle newspaper appears in the X-Men: Evolution episode "On Angel's Wings".
 A parody of the Daily Bugle appears in a skit called "The X-Play Bugle", with Adam Sessler as the editor-in-chief, in the X-Play episode "Spider-Man 3".
 The Daily Bugle appears in Spider-Man: The Animated Series.
 The Daily Bugle appears in The Spectacular Spider-Man. Similar to the depictions seen in the Sam Raimi film trilogy and the Marvels comic miniseries, this version of the newspaper is also housed in the Flatiron Building.
 A variation of the Daily Bugle appears in Ultimate Spider-Man. This version is called Daily Bugle Communications, which serves as a television news outlet, with J. Jonah Jameson (voiced by J. K. Simmons) as its most prominent anchorman.

Film
Sam Raimi's Spider-Man trilogy
The Daily Bugle appears in the live-action films Spider-Man (2002), Spider-Man 2 (2004), and Spider-Man 3 (2007), all directed by Sam Raimi. This version is housed in the Flatiron Building like in the Marvels miniseries, with J. Jonah Jameson (portrayed by J. K. Simmons) as the editor in-chief, Robbie Robertson (portrayed by Bill Nunn) as associate editor, and Betty Brant (portrayed by Elizabeth Banks), Peter Parker (portrayed by Tobey Maguire), and Eddie Brock (portrayed by Topher Grace) as employees. One Bugle employee who appears exclusively in the films is Hoffman (portrayed by Ted Raimi), who serves as comic relief and is frequently harassed by Jameson.

20th Century Fox's Daredevil film
Ben Urich appears in the live-action film Daredevil (2003), although he works for the New York Post instead, as the film rights to the Daily Bugle were owned by Columbia Pictures at the time.

Marc Webb's The Amazing Spider-Man films
The Daily Bugle appears as both a newspaper and television station in the live-action films The Amazing Spider-Man (2012) and The Amazing Spider-Man 2 (2014), both directed by Marc Webb. Peter Parker (portrayed by Andrew Garfield) works for the Bugle in the second film. Jameson is mentioned, but does not appear physically.  To promote the second film, an official Daily Bugle blog was hosted on Tumblr, where promotional material was posted as in-universe articles.

Spider-Verse animated films
The Daily Bugle appears via Peter B. Parker's flashback in Spider-Man: Into the Spider-Verse (2018).

Sony's Spider-Man Universe
In films set in Sony's Spider-Man Universe, the Daily Bugle appears as a newspaper outlet with the same title treatment as the version seen in Sam Raimi's Spider-Man trilogy.

In the live-action film Venom: Let There Be Carnage (2021), the Bugle documents convicted serial killer Cletus Kasady's crimes, which Eddie Brock (portrayed by Tom Hardy) and Patrick Mulligan read while separately collecting evidence for his crimes. In the mid-credits scene, Brock and Venom are transported to the Marvel Cinematic Universe (MCU) and watch Jameson of TheDailyBugle.net broadcasting Peter Parker's identity as Spider-Man, as seen in Far From Home.

During the events of the film Morbius (2022), Milo (Matt Smith) orders a Daily Bugle newspaper from a street news stand in New York City. The organization is also established to have an online presence in a similar fashion to TheDailyBugle.net. In a deleted scene, Michael Morbius reads the front page of a Bugle newspaper covering his apprehension by the police for a "vampire murder" case.

Marvel Cinematic Universe
Christine Everhart is featured prominently in the Marvel Cinematic Universe films Iron Man (2008) and Iron Man 2 (2010) as well as part of promotional material for Ant-Man (2015) and Captain America: Civil War (2016). Due to Sony Pictures owning the Spider-Man film rights and all associated characters and organizations at the time, Everhart was not announced as being portrayed as a reporter for the Daily Bugle. Instead, she initially works as a journalist for Vanity Fair before transitioning towards being an anchor for the in-universe news organization WHIH Newsfront in later years.

Ben Urich appears as a series regular in the first season of the Netflix television series Marvel's Daredevil. However, since the show was in production prior to Marvel Studios and Sony Pictures' agreement to share the Spider-Man film rights, the crew on the show were also restricted from adapting the character as a Daily Bugle employee. Instead, he works for the fictional newspaper agency the New York Bulletin, whose origins in the comics included the company being established by Caxton J. Ford, a former Daily Bugle employee. The agency is also featured prominently throughout the rest of Marvel's Netflix television series, which all share continuity with the MCU.

A controversial online news outlet called TheDailyBugle.net appears in the mid-credits scene of the live-action film Spider-Man: Far From Home (2019),. The outlet is run by J. Jonah Jameson (again portrayed by J. K. Simmons), who plays doctored footage sent in by one of Mysterio's associates to demonize Spider-Man (portrayed by Tom Holland) before publicly revealing his secret identity.

The outlet and Jameson return in the sequel Spider-Man: No Way Home (2021) and the web series The Daily Bugle (2019–present), the latter of which is headlined by Simmons as Jameson and Angourie Rice as Betty Brant. In the film, Jameson launches a misinformed slander campaign against Parker following the reveal of his secret identity as Spider-Man while Brant, who is undergoing an internship at the firm, serves as a correspondent for Jameson while continuing her work on Midtown High's news program, covering Parker's celebrity status within the school. Following Doctor Strange's second, successful attempt at wiping the world's knowledge of Peter's civilian identity, Jameson resumes his coverage of Spider-Man's vigilante activity while promising his viewers that he will uncover the truth of his secret identity.

Video games
 The Daily Bugle appears as a stage in Marvel Super Heroes.
 The Daily Bugle appears in X-Men: Mutant Academy 2.
 The Daily Bugle appears in the 2000 Spider-Man video game.
 The Daily Bugle appears in the 2002 Spider-Man film tie-in game.
 The Daily Bugle appears in the Spider-Man 2 film tie-in game.
 The Daily Bugle appears as a stage in Marvel Nemesis: Rise of the Imperfectss story mode and versus mode.
 The Daily Bugle appears in the 2007 Ghost Rider video game's challenge mode.
 The Daily Bugle appears as a landmark in the Spider-Man 3 film tie-in game.
 The Daily Bugle appears in The Incredible Hulk.
 The Daily Bugle appears in Spider-Man: Web of Shadows.
 The Daily Bugle appears as a stage in Marvel vs Capcom 3: Fate of Two Worlds and Ultimate Marvel vs. Capcom 3.
 Daily Bugle Communications appears in Disney Infinity: 2.0 Edition.
 A Marvel Noir-inspired version of the Daily Bugle appears in Lego Marvel Super Heroes 2.
 The Daily Bugle appears in Marvel's Spider-Man, with Mary Jane Watson as a reporter, later associate editor, and Robbie Robertson as editor-in-chief after J. Jonah Jameson retired to start a podcast. Peter Parker also worked for the Daily Bugle as a photographer before he resigned after Spider-Man was blamed for a killing spree perpetrated by Electro and became Dr. Otto Octavius' research assistant at Octavius Industries some years prior to the events of the game.
 The Daily Bugle appears as a point of interest in Fortnite.
 The Daily Bugle appears in the digital collectible card game Marvel Snap.

Theatre 

 The Daily Bugle appears in the Broadway musical Spider-Man: Turn Off the Dark, with J. Jonah Jameson portrayed by Michael Mulheren through the entirety of the play's run.

Miscellaneous

 An unrelated Daily Bugle appears in the untelevised DC Comics-related pilot The Adventures of Superpup.

References

External links
 The Daily Bugle at Marvel.com
 TheDailyBugle.net official Marvel Cinematic Universe tie-in website

Characters created by Jack Kirby
Characters created by Stan Lee
Comics characters introduced in 1962
Fictional elements introduced in 1962
Fictional newspapers
Spider-Man